Pak Kyong-sam is a North Korean politician.  He has been chairman of the People's Committee of North Pyongan Province since 2002.  In 2003, he was elected to the 11th session of the Supreme People's Assembly.

References
Yonhap News Agency.  "Who's who, North Korea," pp. 787–812 in

See also
Politics of North Korea

Members of the Supreme People's Assembly
Living people
People from North Pyongan
Year of birth missing (living people)